The Lone Ranger is a 2003 American western action television film. It was an attempt by The WB to revive the Lone Ranger franchise for a new generation. The character first appeared in 1933 in a radio show conceived either by WXYZ (Detroit) radio station owner George W. Trendle, or by Fran Striker, the show's writer. The radio series proved to be a hit and spawned a series of books (largely written by Striker), an equally popular television show that ran from 1949 to 1957, comic books, and several movies.

The film, intended as a pilot for a new television series, stars Chad Michael Murray as the Lone Ranger (the name of the Ranger's secret identity was changed from "John Reid" to "Luke Hartman") and Nathaniel Arcand as his Native American companion Tonto.

Plot
This version takes a look at the character in the years before he became a legend. It all begins with the introduction of Luke Hartman, a 20-year-old Boston law student who witnesses the murder of his brother, a Texas Ranger. He himself is wounded in the midst of the chaos, but is rescued by the Apache Tonto, and subsequently becomes smitten with Tonto's sister Alope. He then devotes his life to avenging the death of his brother and fighting injustice, and in the process becoming a worldwide legend.

Cast
 Chad Michael Murray as The Lone Ranger / Luke Hartman
 Nathaniel Arcand as Tonto
 Anita Brown as Alope
 Fay Masterson as Grace Hartman
 Sebastian Spence as Harmon Hartman
 Wes Studi as Kulakinah
 Bradford Tatum as Tryon
 Jeffrey Nordling as James Landry
 Lauren German as Emily Landry
 Tod Thawley as Tera
 Gil Birmingham as One Horn
 Paul Schulze as Sheriff Landry

Critical reception
The show was met with mixed reviews, criticizing the changes to the characters, comedy and soundtrack, and the pilot didn't get picked up for a full series.

References

External links
 

2003 television films
2003 films
Television films as pilots
Television pilots not picked up as a series
Lone Ranger films
Films directed by Jack Bender
The WB original programming
American Western (genre) television films
2000s Western (genre) television series
Films scored by Roger Neill
2000s American films
2000s English-language films